Teodor Currentzis (born 24 February 1972) is a Greek-Russian conductor, musician and actor.

Biography
Currentzis was born in Athens, and at the age of four began to take piano lessons.  At age seven, he began violin lessons.  He entered the National Conservatory, Athens at the age of twelve, in the violin department.  In 1987, aged fifteen he began composition studies under Professor George Hadjinikos, and then in 1989 under Professor B. Shreck.  From 1994 to 1999, Currentzis studied conducting supported by a scholarship from the Alexander S. Onassis Public Benefit Foundation in the St. Petersburg State Conservatory with Ilya Musin.

From 2004 to 2010, Currentzis served as principal conductor of the Novosibirsk Opera and Ballet Theatre, where in 2004 he founded the Orchestra MusicAeterna and later the Chorus MusicAeterna. 
In 2009, Currentzis acted in Ilya Khrzhanovsky's film Dau based on the biography of the physicist Lev Landau. In February 2011, Currentzis became music director of the Perm Opera and Ballet Theatre, to which he brought both of his MusicAeterna groups.

In 2011, Currentzis became principal guest conductor of the Southwest German Radio Symphony Orchestra.  Effective with the 2018–2019 season Currentzis became the first chief conductor of the SWR Symphonieorchester (created by the merger of the Southwest German Radio Symphony Orchestra with the Stuttgart Radio Symphony Orchestra) . In September 2021, the SWR announced a 3-year extension to Currentzis' contract.  In September 2022, the SWR announced that Currentzis was to stand down as chief conductor of the SWR Symphonieorchester at the close of the 2024-2025 season The contract was not renewed upon his own request, and not for political reasons "as some had speculated or hoped".

Critical reception
Currentzis has been idolized as an eccentric, a punk, "Messiah and rebel" in the classic music world, appearing in lace-up boots, skinny jeans and T-shirt. He has been labeled eccentric as he conducted from within the orchestra leaving his pedestal. As of 2022, he has changed however, aappeared in black suit with white cuff shirt, elegant evening shoes and neat haircut.

Currentzis never distinguished himself as a Putin friend, even before the Ukrainian War, unlike his colleague Valeri Gergiev and opera star Anna Netrebko, and he is  much less involved in state structures than Gergiev.

Awards

Currentzis has won the National Theatre Award Golden Mask nine times:
 2007: Special Awards of the Musical Theatre Jury for  Sergei Prokofiev's Cinderella.
 2008: Special Award of the Musical Theatre Jury For Impressive Achievements in Musical Authenticity in Wolfgang Amadeus Mozart's Le Nozze di Figaro.
 2011: Best Conductor of an opera for Alban Berg's Wozzeck at the Bolshoi Theater.
 2013: Best Conductor of an opera for Mozart's Così fan tutte
 2013: Best Conductor of a ballet for Sergei Prokofiev's Chout
 2015: Best Conductor of an opera for Henry Purcell's The Indian Queen
 2017: Best Conductor of an opera for Giuseppe Verdi's La Traviata
 2018: Best Conductor of a ballet for Sergei Prokofiev's Cinderella
 2018: Special Awards of the Musical Theatre Jury for Cantos, Aleksey Syumak's opera

Productions

 2004/05 – Giuseppe Verdi's Aida directed by Dmitri Tcherniakov.
 2005/06 – concert performance and CD record of Henry Purcell's Dido and Aeneas.
 2006/07 – Mozart's Le Nozze di Figaro directed by Tatjana Gürbaca.
 2006/07 – Dmitri Shostakovich's Lady Macbeth of Mtsensk directed by Henrich Baranovsky.
 2007 – Sergei Prokofiev's Cinderella.
 2008/09 – Giuseppe Verdi's Macbeth directed by Dmitri Tcherniakov in Novosibirsk Opera and Ballet Theatre and Opéra Bastille.
 2009/10 – Alban Berg's Wozzeck directed by Dmitri Tcherniakov in Bolshoi Theatre.
 2009/10 – Mozart's Don Giovanni directed by Dmitri Tcherniakov in Bolshoi Theatre and Aix-en-Provence Festival.
 2010 – Mieczysław Weinberg's The Passenger at the Bregenzer Festspiele directed by David Pountney.
 2010 – Alexei Siumak's The Requiem in the Moscow Art Theatre.
 2011 – Mozart's Così fan tutte in the Perm Opera and Ballet Theatre.
 2012 – Tchaikovsky's Iolanta and Stravinsky's Persephone in the Teatro Real, Madrid.
 2012 – Verdi's Macbeth in the Bavarian State Opera, Munich.
 2012 – Sergei Prokofiev's Chout.
 2013 – Purcell's The Indian Queen in the Perm Opera and Ballet Theatre with coproduction of Teatro Real and English National Opera.
 2014 – Dmitry Kurlyandsky's Nosferatu in the Perm Opera and Ballet Theatre.
 2014 – Mozart's Don Giovanni in the Perm Opera and Ballet Theatre.
 2015 – Dmitri Shostakovich's Orango at Diaghilev Festival.
 2016 – Giuseppe Verdi's La Traviata directed by Robert Wilson in the Perm Opera and Ballet Theatre.
 2017 – Mozart's La clemenza di Tito at Salzburg Festival
 2018 – Arthur Honegger's Jeanne d'Arc au bûcher at Diaghilev Festival.
 2018 – Sergei Prokofiev's Cinderella in the Perm Opera and Ballet Theatre.
 2018 – Alexey Symak's Cantos in the Perm Opera and Ballet Theatre.

Discography
Recordings are with Sony Classical unless otherwise noted:
 Purcell: Dido and Aeneas (Alpha, 2008)
 Mozart: Requiem (Alpha, 2011)
 Shostakovich: Symphony No. 14 (Alpha, 2011)
 Shostakovich: Piano Concertos; Sonata for Violin and Piano (Harmonia Mundi, 2012)
 Mozart: Le nozze di Figaro, 2014
 Rameau: The Sound of Light, 2014
 Mozart: Così fan tutte, 2014
 Stravinsky: Le Sacre du printemps, 2015
 Tchaikovsky: Violin Concerto, Stravinsky: Les Noces, 2016
 Mozart: Don Giovanni, 2016
 Artyomov: Symphony Gentle Emanation (Divine Art, 2016)
 Tchaikovsky: Symphony No. 6, 2017
 Mahler: Symphony No. 6, 2018
 Beethoven: Symphony No. 5, 2020
 Beethoven: Symphony No. 7, 2021

Filmography
 Iolanta/Perséphone (Teatro Real, 2012)
 Purcell: The Indian Queen (Sony Classical, 2015)
 Dau: Lev Landau (Ilya Khrzhanovsky, 2019)

See also
 Valeri Gergiev, Russian conductor
 Anna Netrebko, Russian opera singer

References

External links 
 Official Teodor Currentzis website
 Teodor Currentzis Sony Classical
 "The Magnet", by Hartmut Welscher, VAN Magazine, 1 June 2017.

1972 births
Living people
Music directors (opera)
Novosibirsk Opera and Ballet Theatre
Greek conductors (music)
Greek classical musicians
Naturalised citizens of Russia
21st-century conductors (music)
Musicians from Athens